Athiroopa Amaravathi is a 1935 Indian Tamil-language romantic adventure film directed by C. V. Raman. The film stars T. N. Sivakozhundhu, T. S. Velambal and K. Ranganayaki.

Plot 
While on an adventure, Prince Athiroopan falls in love with Amaravathi, a princess.

Cast 

Male cast
 T. N. Sivakozhundhu as Athiroopan
 P. M. Sundarabhashyam as King Vichithra
 K. K. Thangavelu Pillai as Bandit Leader
 P. R. Swaminathan as Bandit
 P. K. Sambandan as Clown
 M. M. Kanakasabai as Madavyan
 F. M. Arumugam as Madavyan
 V. M. Ezhumalai as Madavyan

Female cast
 Miss T. S. Velambal as Amaravathi
 Miss K. Ranganayaki as Rathnavali
 Miss P. S. Krishnaveni as Bandit
Orchestra
 Rangasami Naicker – Harmonium
 Abdul Sadar – Sarangi
 Govindasami – Tabla

Production 
Athiroopa Amaravathi was directed by C. V. Raman and produced by the Coimbatore-based Sundaram Talkies. Shooting took place at Sundaram Sound Studios, which later evolved into Sathya Studios.

Soundtrack 
S. S. Sankaralinga Kavirayaral worked as the lyricist, and historian Randor Guy believes he composed the music too. The songs were recorded by P. K. Viswanathan. The film had 45 songs, most of which were set in carnatic ragas while others were inspired by popular Hindi film songs.

Release and reception 
According to Randor Guy, the film succeeded commercially because of "the interesting adventures of the couple, the comedy scenes, and also the settings and costumes, which were done at considerable expense", despite the "predictable storyline".

References

External links 
 

1930s romance films
1930s Tamil-language films
1935 adventure films
1935 films
Indian adventure films
Indian romance films